A Frozen Dream (En frusen dröm) is a documentary film released in 1997 as a follow-up to the 1982 Swedish movie Flight of the Eagle, both directed by Jan Troell.  The documentary describes the ill-fated attempt to fly over the North Pole in a hydrogen balloon by Salomon August Andrée in 1897.

External links
 

1997 films
Documentary films about ballooning
Films directed by Jan Troell
Swedish documentary films
1990s Swedish-language films
Documentary films about the Arctic
1997 documentary films
1990s Swedish films